Players and pairs who neither have high enough rankings nor receive wild cards may participate in a qualifying tournament held one week before the annual Wimbledon Tennis Championships.

Seeds

  Ingelise Driehuis /  Caroline Vis (qualified)
  Donna Faber /  Shaun Stafford (second round)
  Kate McDonald /  Tracey Morton (qualified)
  Alysia May /  Kimberly Po (second round)
  Lea Antonoplis /  Maria Strandlund (qualifying competition, lucky losers)
  Anne Aallonen /  Karin Kschwendt (first round)
  Lesley O'Halloran /  Jane Thomas (second round)
  Michelle Bowrey /  Robyn Field (first round)

Qualifiers

  Ingelise Driehuis /  Caroline Vis
  Kerry-Anne Guse /  Justine Hodder
  Kate McDonald /  Tracey Morton
  Nicole Pratt /  Kirrily Sharpe

Lucky losers

  Lea Antonoplis /  Maria Strandlund
  Ann Devries /  Kristin Godridge

Qualifying draw

First qualifier

Second qualifier

Third qualifier

Fourth qualifier

External links

1990 Wimbledon Championships on WTAtennis.com
1990 Wimbledon Championships – Women's draws and results at the International Tennis Federation

Women's Doubles Qualifying
Wimbledon Championship by year – Women's doubles qualifying
Wimbledon Championships